Gulshan Lal Ajmani is an Indian politician, son of the late Lala Ishwar Das Ajmani. He is a member of the Bharatiya Janata Party (BJP). He was a member of the Bihar Legislative Assembly in Ranchi (now in Jharkhand) from 1990 to 1995. He was also the president of the Chhotanagpur Chambers of Commerce and Industry and, under his presidency, it was reformed and re-recognized as the Federation of Jharkhand Chamber of Commerce and Industry. He is also the unbeaten president of Punjabi-Hindu Biradari of Jharkhand, since eight years.

Ajmani is married to Darshna Ajmani and has four children.

References 

Living people
Year of birth missing (living people)
Bharatiya Janata Party politicians from Jharkhand
Politicians from Ranchi
Bihar MLAs 1990–1995